The September 1966 Commonwealth Prime Ministers' Conference was the 16th Meeting of the Heads of Government of the Commonwealth of Nations. It was held in the United Kingdom and was hosted by that country's Prime Minister, Harold Wilson.

The conference was dominated by the rebellion of the British colony of Rhodesia which was under the white minority rule regime of Ian Smith. Facing the possible collapse of the Commonwealth, with African states threatening to leave the association if action wasn't taken against Rhodesia, Britain agreed to a policy of No independence before majority rule (NIBMAR). The Commonwealth issued an ultimatum declaring that if the Smith regime did not comply by the end of the year Britain, with Commonwealth support, would seek mandatory sanctions against Rhodesia by the United Nations.

The Commonwealth also issued a statement calling for nuclear disarmament and deploring nuclear weapons testing by France and China.

References

1966
Diplomatic conferences in the United Kingdom
20th-century diplomatic conferences
1966 in international relations
1966 conferences
September 1966 events in the United Kingdom
1966 in London
Events in London
Harold Wilson